National Secondary Route 231, or just Route 231 (or ) is a National Road Route of Costa Rica, located in the Cartago province.

Description
In Cartago province the route covers Cartago canton (Oriental, Aguacaliente districts).

References

Highways in Costa Rica